Henry Harrison Hoyt was a member of the Wisconsin State Assembly.

Biography
Hoyt was born on January 21, 1840, in Sheldon, New York. During the American Civil War, he served with the 5th Wisconsin Volunteer Infantry Regiment of the Union Army. Engagements he took part in include the Siege of Yorktown, the Battle of Williamsburg, the Battle of Crampton's Gap, the Battle of Antietam, the Battle of Fredericksburg and the Battle of Gettysburg.

Assembly career
Hoyt was a member of the Assembly during the 1876 session. He was a Republican.

References

People from Sheldon, New York
People from Richland County, Wisconsin
Republican Party members of the Wisconsin State Assembly
People of Wisconsin in the American Civil War
Union Army soldiers
1840 births
Year of death missing